Dženan Lončarević (born April 10, 1975) is a Serbian pop singer. He has lived in Belgrade since 2006. On March 4, 2019, he competed in the Beovizija with the song "Nema suza" (No Tears) and finished in the second place.

Discography
Nikome ni reč (2007)
Dobro je to (2009)
Zdravo dušo (2011)
No 4 (2013)
Dva su koraka (2015)

1975 births
Living people
People from Prijepolje
Serbian folk-pop singers
21st-century Serbian male singers
Bosniaks of Serbia
Beovizija contestants